The Kota Marudu District is an administrative district in the Malaysian state of Sabah, part of the Kudat Division which includes the districts of Kota Marudu, Kudat and Pitas. The capital of the district is in Kota Marudu Town.

Etymology 
Kota means Fort. The name Marudu originated from the language of Balangigi people from the words of "Mairudu" or "Maiuludu" which means "a position located in the same place", referring to the geographical position of Marudu Bay which forms a large bay. Since then, the term Mairudu turns to Marudu and Mailudu becomes Maludu. Hence, Western writers often refer to Marudu as Marudu, Marudo or Maludu. The name Marudu was first mapped by a Dutch sailor in 1595 who sailed from Brunei and reached Marudu, Palawan and the Sulu Archipelago. While in the waters of Marudu, he found the Balangigi people or also called by the Spaniards as the "Camucones" became the sea troops of the Sultanates of Brunei and Sulu at the time.

History 
The district is once known as the stronghold of a local leader named Sharif Usman. The Sharif administer the area under the consent of the Sultanate of Sulu although he administer the place under his own as an independent chiefdom. He later involved in a dispute with the colonial authorities of British North Borneo after being accused as a pirate and involved in a slave trade, where he was killed during a battle with the latter and his entire fort in the area was destroyed.

Demographics 

The population of Kota Marudu district according to the last census in 2010 is 66,374. It consists mainly of Dusun, Rungus, Bajau, Orang Sungai and Chinese (mainly Hakkas and Hokkien). As in other districts of Sabah, there are a significant number of illegal immigrants from the nearby southern Philippines, notably from the Sulu Archipelago and Mindanao which are not included in the population statistics.

Gallery

See also 
 Districts of Malaysia

Notes

References

Further reading

External links 

  Kota Marudu District Council
  Kota Marudu District Office